Arthur Welshe (fl. 1563) was an English politician.

Life
Welshe's life remains obscure. There are other Welshes within Morpeth, Northumberland at this time, indicating that he was probably a local man, and probably a burgess of the town.

Career
He was a Member (MP) of the Parliament of England for Morpeth in 1563.

References

Year of birth missing
Year of death missing
People from Morpeth, Northumberland
English MPs 1563–1567